Khatikan Pyau is a village in Sikar district of Rajasthan, India. It is located 3.2 kilometres from Sikar, 39 kilometres from Nawalgarh, and 2.7 kilometres from Railway Hospital, Sikar. The village is administrated by a sarpanch who is an elected representative of village as per Panchayati raj (India). Khatikan pyau is the type of Khatik Mohalla where Khatik people live.

Religious places
Khatikan Bagichi Hindu temple is just 450 mtr. Sri Vriddheshwar Mahadev Mandir is popular hindu temple there. Harshnath Hindu temple is just 19 kilometers.

Transport 
Sikar bus stand is 3.8 kilometers from Khatikan pyau and Jaipur International airport is 130 kilometers away.

See also 
 Khatik Mohalla (disambiguation)

References 

Villages in Sikar district